Plethorodon is an extinct genus of tillodont that lived during Early to Late Paleocene. The type species is P. qianshanensis. which known from partial skull and upper teeth that had been discovered by Huang and Zheng at 1987 at Qianshan, Anhui Province, China.

References

Plethorodon at fossilworks

Further reading

External links
Plethorodon qianyshanensis at Paleozoological museum of China official website (Chinese)

Tillodontia
Paleocene mammals
Paleogene mammals of Asia
Fossil taxa described in 1987
Prehistoric mammal genera